The Portland metropolitan area is the metropolitan area centered on Portland, Oregon.

The Portland metropolitan area may also refer to:

The Portland, Maine metropolitan area, United States

See also
Portland (disambiguation)